Camatagua is a town in the state of Aragua, Venezuela. It is the shire town of the Camatagua Municipality. It was founded in 1693 (as Purísima Concepción de Camatagua), as a settlement of indigenous people. It was refounded in 1716 by more than 30 families of the Guaiquerí.

Populated places in Aragua